Eoin Rheinisch (born 21 February 1980 in Dublin) is an Irish slalom canoeist and three-time Olympic competitor. He competed at the international level from 1996 to 2013.

He is from Leixlip, County Kildare.

Olympic record
Rheinisch competed at the Summer Olympic Games in 2004, 2008 and 2012.

He competed in the 2004 Olympic K1 event where he finished 21st of 25 overall, exiting the competition after the heats.

He came fourth in the 2008 Olympics K1 event. His performance in the Olympic Final was the best ever achievement by an Irish competitor in this event. Previously Ian Wiley finished fifth in the same event at the Atlanta Olympics.

Rheinisch competed at the 2012 Summer Olympics in London and qualified for the semifinals of the K1 event, but failed to make it to the finals after incurring a 50-second penalty for missing an upstream gate. He finished in 14th place.

World Cup individual podiums

Family
Irish marathon champion Gary Crossan is his cousin.

Involvement in Gaelic games
During his short spell as senior Westmeath county football team manager, Brendan Hackett appointed Rheinisch as a member of his backroom team in 2009 to assist with "physical preparations".

References

1980 births
Living people
Canoeists at the 2004 Summer Olympics
Canoeists at the 2008 Summer Olympics
Canoeists at the 2012 Summer Olympics
Irish male canoeists
Irish people of German descent
Olympic canoeists of Ireland
People from Leixlip
Sportspeople from County Kildare
Westmeath county football team